The 1995–96 Armenian Cup was the fifth edition of the Armenian Cup, a football competition. In 1995–96, the tournament had 24 participants, none of which were reserve teams.

Results

First round
Kapan-81, Vanadzor, Arabkir, Nairit, Karabakh Yerevan, Ararat Yerevan, Shirak and FC Yerevan received byes to the second round.

The first legs were played on 31 August 1995. The second legs were played on 14 September 1995.

|}

Second round
The first legs were played on 1 March 1996. The second legs were played on 6 and 8 March 1996.

|}

Quarter-finals
The first legs were played on 1 and 2 April 1996. The second legs were played on 5 and 13 April 1996.

|}

Semi-finals
The first legs were played on 3 and 4 May 1996. The second legs were played on 13 and 14 May 1996.

|}

Final

See also
 1995–96 Armenian Premier League

External links
 1995–96 Armenian Cup at rsssf.com

Armenian Cup seasons
Armenia
Armenian Cup, 1996
Armenian Cup, 1996